Shelley is a former town on the Cudgewa railway line in Northeast Victoria.

The Shelley Railway Station was opened in 1916 and closed in 1979. The railway was used early in its life to transport farmer's livestock from the Upper Murray to Wodonga. From the 1950s the railway was used heavily to transport equipment and machinery from Wodonga to the Upper Murray to help build the Snowy Mountains Hydro Electric Scheme.

The Snowy Hydro Scheme was completed in 1974 and after several years of low level use, the railway was closed. Some remnants of the Shelley Station passenger platform can still be seen here today, along with some information boards. The Shelley Railway Station forms part of the High Country Rail Trail.

The area is now chiefly characterised by extensive pine plantations; HVP purchased the Koetong and Shelley Pine Plantations from State Government in 1998 and it has been owned and run by HVP ever since. The HVP Plantations contribute to local employment in the area.

Climate

Being one of the highest localities in Victoria and located near the southern boundary of the South West Slopes, winters are particularly cold by maximum temperatures, with frequent and oftentimes heavy snowfalls. Cloudy skies dominate from May through to September.

Rainfall peaks distinctly in winter.

References